America's Most Wanted, also known as A.M.W., was an American hip hop group from Oakland, California, made up of Tyrell "The Boss Man" Brewer, Charles "Chucksta" Mack, Chris "Mellow-D" Wilson and "Cheech Mack" (Unknown Name). They were signed to Triad Records and Shot Records.

They came together in 1989 to release their first album, Criminals, which peaked at number 66 on the Billboard Top R&B/Hip-Hop Albums chart. Five years later, by which time Mellow-D had left the group, Cheech Mack was added back into the group once released from jail. They released their second and final album, The Real Mobb, which failed to chart. In 1996, the group disbanded.

Lil Big & The Boss Man are the same person. (Tyrell Brewer)

Discography

References 

Hip hop groups from California
Musical groups from Oakland, California